Gevelsberg Hauptbahnhof (German for Gevelsberg main station) is a railway station in the municipality of Gevelsberg in the German state of North Rhine-Westphalia.  The station was opened along with a section of the Düsseldorf-Derendorf–Dortmund Süd railway, opened by the Rhenish Railway Company (RhE) between Wuppertal-Wichlinghausen and Hagen RhE station (now Hagen-Eckesey depot) on 15 September 1879. It has two platform tracks and it is classified by Deutsche Bahn as a category 6 station. It is the only Hauptbahnhof in Germany, which in fact is not a Bahnhof, but a Haltepunkt ("halt", defined in Germany as having no sets of points). It and Remscheid Hauptbahnhof are the only Hauptbahnhof stations which are served only by S-Bahn trains.

Operational usage
The station is served by Rhine-Ruhr S-Bahn line S 8 between Mönchengladbach and Hagen and line S 9 between Recklinghausen and Hagen, both every 60 minutes. The station along with Remscheid Hauptbahnhof are the only Hauptbahnhofs in Germany that are served exclusively by S-Bahn trains. This is because Gevelsberg as a municipality is a relatively recent creation, and traditionally Ennepetal (Gevelsberg) on the direct line from Wuppertal to Hagen carries most of the regional and mid-distance traffic for Ennepetal and Gevelsberg. Whilst Gevelsberg Hbf therefore is more central to Gevelsberg, it does not offer any connections other than the S8 and S9 trains running twice an hour, making it one of the least busy Hauptbahnhof stations in Germany.

The station is also served by the follow bus services:

Notes

Railway stations in Germany opened in 1879
Rhine-Ruhr S-Bahn stations
S8 (Rhine-Ruhr S-Bahn)
S9 (Rhine-Ruhr S-Bahn)
Ennepe-Ruhr-Kreis